The Genesis Code may refer to:

A 1997 novel by John Case
The Genesis Code, a 2010 film